The following is a list of horror films released in 2006.

References

Lists of horror films by year
2006-related lists